The Church of the Holy Trinity is a Roman Catholic church in Rollingstone, Minnesota, United States, built in 1869 and expanded in 1893.  It was listed on the National Register of Historic Places in 1984 for having local significance in the themes of architecture and exploration/settlement.  It was nominated for its Gothic Revival architecture and central role in the religious, social, and—through its associated parochial school—academic life in a Luxembourg American community.

History
The settlement of Rollingstone was established in 1855 by ethnic Germans from Luxembourg, and by 1861 they had established a wood-frame church and a cemetery. However the community quickly outgrew the original building, so they constructed a new church of local limestone in 1869.

In 1893 the parish had again outgrown the building, so they built an addition which doubled the seating capacity.

The interior has been remodeled substantially since the church was built, so almost none of the original interior design remains.

See also
 List of Catholic churches in the United States
 National Register of Historic Places listings in Winona County, Minnesota

References

External links
 Holy Trinity/St. Mary's/St. Paul's Parishes

Churches in the Roman Catholic Diocese of Winona-Rochester
Churches in Winona County, Minnesota
German-American culture in Minnesota
Gothic Revival church buildings in Minnesota
Limestone buildings in the United States
Luxembourgian-American culture in Minnesota
National Register of Historic Places in Winona County, Minnesota
Churches on the National Register of Historic Places in Minnesota
Roman Catholic churches completed in 1893
19th-century Roman Catholic church buildings in the United States